The 1936 Iraqi coup d'état, also known as the Bakr Sidqi coup, was initiated by general Bakr Sidqi in order to overthrow Prime Minister Yasin al-Hashimi of the Kingdom of Iraq.  The coup succeeded in installing Sidqi's ally Hikmat Sulayman as the new Prime Minister, while Sidqi was de facto ruler of Iraq as powerful Chief of Staff.  Bakr Sidqi's reign would be short; he was assassinated the next year in Mosul, and Sulayman was obliged to resign his post. 

The overthrow was the first modern military coup in Iraq and in the Arab world.  After Bakr Sidqi's coup and until 1941, in a wave of political instability, the Kingdom of Iraq experienced 6 more political coups involving extra-constitutional transfer of power.

The coup
In 1936, during the reign of Faisal's ineffectual son King Ghazi I, General Bakr Sidqi—who was recently named Chief of the General Staff of the Royal Iraqi Army—staged what was probably the first modern military coup d'état in the Arab world against the government of Yasin al-Hashimi.  Bakr Sidqi chose his timing carefully.  The Chief of Staff, General Taha al-Hashimi, was in Ankara, Turkey.  Before the day of the coup, Sidqi ensured that battalions of the Iraqi army not led by his allies were far afield, leaving the capital defenseless; the Iraqi Air Force has been sent off for joint maneuvers with the RAF near the Iranian border.

Eleven Iraqi military planes dropped leaflets over Baghdad on October 29, 1936, requesting the King for the dismissal of Yasmin al-Hashimi's administration and for the installment of the ousted anti-reform Prime Minister Hikmat Sulayman.  In addition, the leaflets warned the citizens that military action will be taken against those who do not "answer our sincere appeal".  The leaflets were signed by Sidqi himself as the "Commander of the National Forces of Reform".  He threatened to attack the palace using military units loyal to him and his allies by his authority as acting of Chief of Staff and overthrow the government if his demands were not met in three hours.  

Interference by Sidqi's opponents was neutralized by Sidqi.  He sent a telegram to Taha al-Hashimi ordering him not to return. In an interview conducted by Majid Khadduri, the writer claims that Sidqi had disclosed Khodduri that the king had called the British Ambassador, Sir Archibald Clark Kerr, over to Zahur Palace for advice. The ambassador suggested that the king invite all ministers in the government for an emergency meeting. Of those in attendance were Yasin al-Hashimi, Nuri as-Sa’id, General Ja’far al-Askari and Rashid Ali, minister of interior.  The king initially discounted any notion of a revolutionary movement; however, this proved incorrect as reports of bombing in Serai and the advancement of troops towards Baghdad reached the palace. With the exception of Nuri al-Sa’id, all those present in the palace agreed to comply with the demands of Bakr Sidqi and allow Hikmat Sulayman to step into power. As a result, Yasin al-Hashimi resigned. According to Khodduri, Ambassador Kerr suggested that Hikmat be invited to the meeting. Coincidentally, Sulayman arrived at the palace to deliver the letter, written by Sidqi and Latif Nuri, to the king explaining the implications of the coup.  The exact details of the negotiation are subject to speculation; some have suggested that King Ghazi was jealous of Nuri al-Said and on bad terms with Yasin al-Hashimi anyway, leading to the quick decision to surrender.

Jafar al-Askari, who was minister of defense during the coup and twice the prime minister of Iraq prior to Yasin al-Hashimi, sought to convince two battalions loyal to Sidqi to stop advancing toward Baghdad.  He tried to appeal to officers who remembered his role as a founding father of the Iraqi army. His appeals were intercepted by allies of Sidqi, however. Cautious of any dissension, Sidqi sent two of his men, Akram Mustapha, a member of the air force, and Ismail Tohalla, who had participated in the Simele Massacre, to assassinate him. The death of al-Askari was widely viewed as a personal threat to the old government and demonstrated Sidqi's quest to purge any who might contest his shaky control over the army. After this incident, Nuri al-Sa’id escaped to Cairo and Yasin al-Hashimi left for Istanbul.  Yasin also insisted that the king write a formal letter accepting his resignation.

Despite the obvious overthrow, Sidqi found it necessary to enter the capital city of Baghdad with the army and parade with the citizens. According to Khodduri, some felt this was a move to dissuade any last-minute resistance while others felt that Sidqi wanted to prove himself with the parade and be applauded for bringing in a new regime for Iraq.

As a result of the coup, Sulayman became Prime Minister and Minister of Interior, but after overthrowing the government, it was Sidqi, who as commander of the armed forces, essentially ruled Iraq.  He appointed personal adherents and allies to key posts. Some other members of the new cabinet included Abu al-Timman, Minister of Finance, Kamil al-Chadirchi, Minister of Economics and Public Works, Abd al-Latif, Minister of Defense and Yusuf Izz ad-Din Ibrahim as Minister of Education. Though Sidqi was instrumental in the formation of the coup, he did not want a cabinet position and remained Chief of the General Staff.

British stance
In 1936, the United Kingdom still exercised a great deal of influence in Iraq, notably due to various military bases which Britain kept by the treaties it had made with Iraq during the process of ending the Mandate.  Advisor Cecil J. Edmonds appears to have been blindsided by the coup due to the low number of officers involved, although Hikmat Sulayman had attempted to contact him for a meeting before the coup, which presumably would have been an attempt to assess British feelings and gain British support for the cause.  Ultimately, while the British briefly mobilized troops in Cairo in case they were needed, the British ultimately acquiesced to the coup, and the coup plotters did not undertake hostile action against British concessions or interests.

Aftermath
Badr Sidqi wanted to improve Iraqi ties towards Iran and Kemalist Turkey.  He and Sulayman were also unenthused by pan-Arabism, which the previous government and many Sunni clerics supported.  Sulayman instead hoped for a more pluralistic vision of Iraq that would include Shia and Kurds more closely, which would fit with closer relations with Shia Iran.  Sulayman also began investigations of the sources of wealth from members of the previous government, which uncovered various incidents of corruption and abuse of office for personal gain.

The murder of al-Askari created a backlash, as did various other terror incidents such as the murder of Diya Yunis, a secretary of the cabinet in the previous government, and the attempted murder of Mawlud Mukhlis, a prominent pan-Arabist.  This created strong feelings against the new government, and Sulayman's cabinet lasted under ten months before Sidqi was assassinated. In August 1937, while en route to Turkey, Sidqi was assassinated in the garden of one of the air force bases in Mosul along with Mohammad ‘Ali Jawad, the commanding officer of the Iraqi Royal Air Force. Both Sidqi and Jawad were sent as part of a military mission by the Iraqi government, in response to an invitation from the Turkish government. Sidqi had stopped in Mosul on August 11 on the way to Turkey to spend the afternoon with Jawed when a soldier named Muhammad ‘Ali Talla’fari opened fire, instantly killing both men. The bodies of both men were flown to Baghdad the following day and buried with full military honors.

Many attribute his murder to Sulayman's anti-corruption reforms and Sidqi's dissociation from the idea of pan-Arabism. It is still unclear as to who was behind the death of Sidqi, but many conspiracy theories have emerged. Some rumors at the time claimed that the British in conjunction with Nuri al-Sa’id were behind it.  Liora Lukitz suggests that the most likely theory is the one the Sulayman government initially gave: that Sidqi was assassinated by a group of seven dissident military officers, who had withdrawn their support from Sidqi after he had promoted personal allies to key military posts.

As a result of Sidqi's assassination, Sulayman resigned as Prime Minister and was succeeded by Jamil al-Midfai.  Nuri al-Said returned from Cairo, and many of his allies resumed positions of power in the new government.  Pan-Arabism returned to prominence, and with it the more Sunni-dominated vision of Iraq.

Importance
The 1936 coup marked the "beginning of end" of constitutional order in Iraq. After 1936, extra-constitutional, often violent transfers of power became a rule more than exception, while the rule of constitutional monarchy began its gradual disintegration.

See also
 1941 Iraqi coup d'état

References

Military coups in Iraq
20th century in Iraq
Iraqi coup d'etat
Iraqi Coup D'etat, 1936
Iraq
Rebellions in Iraq